The Hepialidae are a family of insects in the lepidopteran order. Moths of this family are often referred to as swift moths or ghost moths.

Taxonomy and systematics
The Hepialidae constitute by far the most diverse group of the infraorder Exoporia. The 60 genera contain at least 587 currently recognised species of these primitive moths worldwide. The genera Fraus (endemic to Australia), Gazoryctra (Holarctic), Afrotheora (Southern African), and Antihepialus (African) are considered to be the most primitive, containing four genera and about 51 species with a mostly relictual southern Gondwanan distribution and are currently separated from the Hepialidae sensu stricto which might form a natural, derived group. The most diverse genera are Oxycanus with 73 species, Endoclita with 60 species, Thitarodes with 51 species and Cibyra with 50 species following a comprehensive catalogue of Exoporia. The relationships of the many genera are not yet well established; see below for an ordered synonymic generic checklist, and the Taxobox for navigation.

Morphology and identification
The family Hepialidae is considered to be very primitive, with a number of structural differences to other moths including very short antennae and the lack of a functional proboscis or frenulum (see Kristensen, 1999: 61–62 for details). Like other Exoporia the sperm is transferred to the egg by an external channel between the ostium and the ovipore. Other nonditrysian moths have a common cloaca. The moths are homoneurous with similar forewings and hindwings, and are sometimes included as 'honorary' members of the Macrolepidoptera, though archaic they are. Strictly speaking, they are phylogenetically too basal and constitute Microlepidoptera, although hepialids range from very small moths to a wingspan record of 250 mm in Zelotypia. Because of their sometimes large size and striking colour patterns, they have received more popular and taxonomic attention than most "micros". Many species display strong sexual dimorphism, with males smaller but more boldly marked than females, or at high elevation, females of Pharmacis and Aoraia show "brachypterous" wing reduction.

Distribution

Hepialidae are distributed on ancient landmasses worldwide except Antarctica but with the surprising exceptions of Madagascar, the Caribbean islands and in Africa, tropical West Africa. It remains to be borne out if these absences are real as Aenetus cohici was not long ago discovered in New Caledonia. In the Oriental and Neotropical regions hepialids have diversified in rainforest environments, but this not apparently the case in the Afrotropics. Hepialids mostly have low dispersive powers and do not occur on oceanic islands with the exception of Phassodes on Fiji and Western Samoa and a few species in Japan and Kurile Islands. Whilst the type locality of Eudalaca sanctahelena is from the remote island of St Helena, this is thought to be an error for South Africa.

Behaviour
Swift moths are usually crepuscular and some species form leks, also thought to have arisen independently in the genus Ogygioses (Palaeosetidae). In most genera, males fly swiftly to virgin females that are calling with scent. In other genera, virgin females "assemble" upwind to displaying males, which emit a musky pheromone from scales on the metathoracic tibiae. In such cases of sex role reversal, there may be visual cues also: males of the European ghost swift are possibly the most frequently noticed species, being white, ghostly and conspicuous when forming a lek at dusk. Sometimes they hover singly as if suspended from a thread or flying in a figure of eight motion. The chemical structures of some pheromones have been analysed.

Biology
The female does not lay its eggs in a specific location but scatters ("broadcasts") them while in flight, sometimes in huge numbers (29,000 were recorded from a single female Trictena, which is presumably a world record for the Lepidoptera). The maggot-like larvae feed in a variety of ways. Probably all Exoporia have concealed larvae, making silken tunnels in all manner of substrates. Some species feed on leaf litter, fungi, mosses, decaying vegetation, ferns, gymnosperms and a wide span of monocot and dicot plants. There is very little evidence of hostplant specialisation; whilst the South African species Leto venus is restricted to the tree Virgilia capensis this may be a case of "ecological monophagy". A few feed on foliage (the austral 'oxyacanine' genera which may drag foliage into their feeding tunnel: Nielsen et al., 2000: 825). Most feed underground on fine roots, at least in early instars and some then feed internally in tunnels in the stem or trunk of their hostplants. Root-feeding larvae travelling through soil make silk-lined tunnels. Before pupating they make a vertical tunnel, which can be up to 10 cm deep, with an exit close to the ground surface. The pupae can then climb up and down to adjust to changes in temperature and flooding. Before the adult moth emerges, the pupa protrudes half way out at the ground surface. The pupa has rows of dorsal spines on the abdominal segments as in other lower members of the  Heteroneura.

Economic significance
Chinese medicine makes considerable use of the "mummies" collected of the caterpillar-attacking fungi Ophiocordyceps sinensis, and these can form an expensive ingredient. The witchetty grub (which are sometimes hepialid larvae) is a popular food source especially among aboriginal Australians. In Central America and South America, hepialid larvae are also eaten. However, some species of Wiseana, Oncopera, Oxycanus, Fraus and Dalaca are considered pests of pastures in Australia, New Zealand, and South America.

Phylogeny
The Hepialidae were identified as having primitive wing venation by John Henry Comstock (1893). In his study of Evolution of the Wings of Insects he shows that the fore and hind wings of Sthenopis (Hepialus) argenteomaculatus maintain a five branched radius while in the remainder of the Lepidoptera the hind wing radius is merged into one vein.  This identifies the Hepialidae as a primitive relict of primitive wing venation.

Faunas

Fauna of Europe
Source and identification
Gazoryctra fuscoargenteus O. Bang-Haas 1927 – Northern Scandinavia
Gazoryctra ganna (Hübner 1808) – Alps, northern Scandinavia, northern Russia
Hepialus humuli Linnaeus 1758 (ghost moth) – Europe
Korscheltellus lupulina Linnaeus 1758 (common swift) – Europe
Pharmacis aemiliana Costantini 1911 – Italy
Pharmacis anselminae Teobaldelli 1977 – Italy
Pharmacis bertrandi Le Cerf 1936 – France
Pharmacis carna Denis & Schiffermüller 1775 – Central and Eastern Europe
Pharmacis castillana Oberthür 1883 – Spain
Pharmacis claudiae Kristal & Hirneisen 1994 – Italy
Pharmacis fusconebulosa De Geer 1778 (map-winged swift) – Europe
Pharmacis pyrenaicus Donzel 1838 – Pyrenees
Phymatopus hecta Linnaeus 1758 (gold swift) – Central and northern Europe
Triodia adriaticus Osthelder 1931 – Croatia, North Macedonia, Greece, Crete
Triodia amasinus Herrich-Schäffer 1851 – Balkans
Triodia sylvina Linnaeus 1761 (orange swift) – Europe

Generic checklist
Fraus Walker, 1856
=Hectomanes Meyrick, 1980
=Praus; Pagenstacher, 1909
Gazoryctra Hübner, [1820]
=Garzorycta; Hübner, [1826]
=Gazoryctes; Kirby, 1892
Afrotheora Nielsen and Scoble, 1986
Antihepialus Janse, 1942
=Ptycholoma; Felder, 1874
Bipectilis Chus and Wang, 1985
Palpifer Hampson, [1893]
=Palpiphorus; Quail, 1900
=Palpiphora; Pagenstacher, 1909
Eudalaca Viette, 1950
=Eudalacina Paclt, 1953
Gorgopis Hübner, [1820]
=Gorcopis; Walker, 1856
Metahepialus Janse, 1942
Dalaca Walker, 1856
=Huapina Bryk, 1945
=Maculella Viette, 1950
=Toenga Tindale, 1954
Callipielus Butler, 1882
=Stachyocera Ureta, 1957
Blanchardinella Nielsen, Robinson & Wagner, 2000
=Blanchardina Viette, 1950, nec Labbe, 1899
Calada Nielsen and Robinson, 1983
Puermytrans Viette, 1951
Parapielus Viette, 1949
=Lossbergiana Viette, 1951
Andeabatis Nielsen and Robinson, 1983
Druceiella Viette, 1949
Trichophassus Le Cerf, 1919
Phassus Walker, 1856
Schausiana Viette, 1950
Aplatissa Viette, 1953
Pfitzneriana Viette, 1952
Cibyra Walker, 1856
Cibyra (Pseudodalaca Viette, 1950)
Cibyra (Gymelloxes Viette, 1952)
Cibyra (Alloaepytus Viette, 1951)
Cibyra (Aeptus) Herrich-Schäffer, [1858]
Cibyra (Thiastyx Viette, 1951)
Cibyra (Schaefferiana Viette, 1950)
Cibyra (Paragorgopis Viette, 1952)
Cibyra (Hepialyxodes Viette, 1951)
Cibyra (Xytrops Viette, 1951)
Cibyra (Cibyra Walker, 1856)
Cibyra (Lamelliformia Viette, 1952)
Cibyra (Tricladia Felder, 1874)
=Pseudophassus Pfitzner, 1914
=Parana Viette, 1950
Cibyra (Pseudophilaenia Viette, 1951)
Cibyra (Philoenia Kirby, 1892)
=Philaenia auctt.
Cibyra (Yleuxas Viette, 1951)
Phialuse Viette, 1961
Roseala Viette, 1950
Dalaca auctt., nec Walker, 1856
Pfitzneriella Viette, 1951
Aoraia Dumbleton, 1966
=Trioxycanus Dumbleton, 1966
Triodia
=Alphus Wallengren, 1869, nec Dejean, 1833
Korscheltellus Börner, 1920
Pharmacis Hübner, [1820]
Thitarodes Viette, 1968
=Forkalus Chu and Wang, 1985
Phymatopus Wallengren, 1869
=Hepiolopsis Börner, 1920
=Phimatopus; auctt.
Phymatopus auctt. nec Wallengren, 1869
Hepialus Fabricius, 1775
=Hepiolus Illiger, 1801
=Epialus Agassiz, 1847
=Epiolus Agassiz, 1847
=Tephus Wallengren, 1869
=Trepialus; Latreille, [1805]
Zenophassus Tindale, 1941
Sthenopis auctt. nec Packard, [1865]
Endoclita; Felder, 1874
=Endoclyta, Felder, 1875
=Hypophassus, Le Cerf, 1919
=Nevina, Tindale, 1941
=Sahyadrassus,  Tindale, 1941
=Procharagia, Viette, 1949
Neohepialiscus Viette, 1948
Elhamma Walker, 1856
=Perissectis Meyrick, 1890
=Pericentris; Pagenstacher, 1909
=Zauxieus Viette, 1952
=Theaxieus Viette, 1952
Jeana Tindale, 1935
Cladoxycanus Dumbleton, 1966
Wiseana Viette, 1961
=Porina Walker, 1956, nec d'Orbigny, 1852
=Gorina; Quail, 1899
=Goryna; Quail, 1899
=Philpottia Viette, 1950, nec Broun, 1915
Heloxycanus Dugdale, 1994
Dumbletonius; auctt
=Trioxycanus Dumbleton, 1966
Dioxycanus Dumbleton, 1966
Napialus Chu and Wang, 1985
Hepialiscus Hampson, [1893]
Parahepialiscus Viette, 1950
Xhoaphryx Viette, 1953
Aenetus Herrich-Schäffer, [1858]
=Charagia Walker, 1856
=Phloiopsyche Scott, 1864
=Oenetus; Kirby, 1892
=Choragia; Pagenstacher, 1909
=Oenetes; Oke, 1953
Leto Hübner, [1820]
=Ecto; Pagenstacher, 1909
Zelotypia Scott, 1869
=Xylopsyche Swainson, 1851
=Leto; auctt
Oncopera
=Oncoptera Walker, 1890
=Paroncopera Tindale, 1933
=Onchopera; Birket-Smith, 1974
=Onchoptera; Birket-Smith, 1974
Trictena Meyrick, 1890
Bordaia Tindale, 1932
=Bordaja; Chu and Wang, 1985
Abantiades Herrich-Schäffer, [1858]
=Pielus Walker, 1856
=Rhizopsyche Scott, 1864
Oxycanus Walker, 1856
=Porina Walker, 1856
=Gorina; Quail, 1899
=Goryna; Quail, 1899
=Paraoxyxanus Viette, 1950
Phassodes Bethune-Baker, 1905

Cited literature

References

Comstock, J.H., (1893). Evolution of the Wings of Insects. The Wilder Quarter Century Book, Ithaca, NY.
Kristensen, N.P., (1999). The non-Glossatan Moths. Ch. 4, pp. 41–62  in Kristensen, N.P. (Ed.). Lepidoptera, Moths and Butterflies. Volume 1: Evolution, Systematics, and Biogeography. Handbook of Zoology. A Natural History of the phyla of the Animal Kingdom. Band / Volume IV Arthropoda: Insecta Teilband / Part 35: 491 pp. Walter de Gruyter, Berlin, New York.
Nielsen, E.S., Robinson, G.S. and Wagner, D.L. 2000. Ghost-moths of the world: a global inventory and bibliography of the Exoporia (Mnesarchaeoidea and Hepialoidea) (Lepidoptera) Journal of Natural History, 34(6): 823–878.

External links

Tree of Life
Australian Moths Online
Hepialidae of Australia 
Hepialidae of the World – List of Genera and Links to Species
LepIndex list of Hepialidae genera and species
Endoclita and Hepialus pheromones
Abstract, counterfeit hepialid mummies
Images of Hepialidae species in New Zealand 
Obituary of Norman B. Tindale

 
Moth families
Taxa named by James Francis Stephens